Waynesboro is the name of some places in the United States of America:

Waynesboro, Georgia
Waynesboro, Mississippi
Waynesboro, Pennsylvania
Waynesboro, Tennessee
Waynesboro, Virginia

See also
Waynesborough, historic home of General Anthony Wayne (1745-1796), in Paoli, Pennsylvania
Goldsboro, North Carolina (formerly, Waynesborough)